This is a list of games for the Bandai WonderSwan handheld video game system, organized alphabetically by name, with the catalog number where known. The system and its games were not released outside Japan. There are  games released on the original Wonderswan and they are compatible on every version of Wonderswan.

Notes

References

External links
WonderSwan games (2000)
WonderSwan games (1999)

Japan-exclusive video games
WonderSwan